Tolulope (diminutive form of Toluwalope) is a Unisex Nigerian given name of Yoruba origin meaning ''"To God be the Glory/Thanks/Gratitude"'

Notable people with the name include:
Tolulope "Jordan" Omogbehin, American wrestler
Tolulope Ogunlesi, Nigerian journalist
Tolulope Adesina, Nigerian musician
Toluwalope Akinyemi, Nigerian writer
Tolulope Odebiyi, Nigerian politician
Folasade Tolulope Ogunsola Nigerian academic
Adesua Tolulope Etomi-Wellington, Nigerian actress
Tolulope Arotile (1995–2020), Nigerian Air Force helicopter pilot 
Tolulope Popoola, Nigerian author

References

Unisex given names
Yoruba given names